Nawnge is a village in Hsi Hseng Township, Taunggyi District, in the Shan State of eastern Burma.  It is located just west of the town of Loisawn. A road connects it to Lothkan and Nampan on the south shore of Inle Lake in the west.

References

External links
Maplandia World Gazetteer

Populated places in Taunggyi District
Hsi Hseng Township